Richard A. Cooper (March 9, 1872 – October 9, 1956) was an American politician in Pennsylvania.

Cooper served from 1907 to 1920 on the Philadelphia City Council. During his tenure as a city councilor, he was involved in organizing Philadelphia's 50th anniversary celebration of the Emancipation Proclamation. A Republican, he served in the Pennsylvania House of Representatives in 1935. He is buried at the Eden Cemetery in Collingdale.

Cooper was born in Maryland. He worked as an insurance agent.

See also
List of African-American officeholders (1900-1959)

References

1872 births
1956 deaths
Philadelphia City Council members
African-American state legislators in Pennsylvania
20th-century American politicians
Insurance agents
Republican Party members of the Pennsylvania House of Representatives
20th-century American businesspeople
African-American city council members in Pennsylvania
American businesspeople in insurance
Businesspeople from Philadelphia
Burials at Eden Cemetery (Collingdale, Pennsylvania)
African-American men in politics